Ixora umbellata is a species of flowering plant in the family Rubiaceae. It is found from southern Indo-China to western Malaysia.

References

External links
World Checklist of Rubiaceae

umbellata
Taxonomy articles created by Polbot